Columbia station may refer to:

 Columbia Station (Washington), an Amtrak station in Wenatchee, Washington, United States
 Columbia station (South Carolina), an Amtrak station in Columbia, South Carolina, United States
 Columbia station (SkyTrain), a SkyTrain station in New Westminster, British Columbia, Canada
 Columbia station (Missouri, Kansas, and Texas Railroad), a disused Missouri, Kansas, and Texas Railroad station in Columbus, Missouri, United States
 Columbia station, former name for Cecil B. Moore station, part of Philadelphia's SEPTA system in Pennsylvania, United States
 Columbia station (Wabash Railroad), a disused Wabash Railroad train station in Columbia, Missouri, United States
 Columbia Station, Ohio, a township in Lorain County, Ohio, United States
 Columbia Avenue station, former name for Temple University station, part of Philadelphia's SEPTA system in Pennsylvania, United States
 Columbia Generating Station, a nuclear energy facility in the USDE Hanford Site in Washington, United States
 116th Street–Columbia University (IRT Broadway–Seventh Avenue Line), IRT station in New York City, United States
 Columbia City station, a light rail station in Seattle, Washington, United States